Nyctophilini is a taxonomic group of bat species, a tribe of the vespertilionid subfamily Vespertilioninae. The alliance isolates two genera, Nyctophilus and Pharotis, referred to as the large-eared bats for the size of these proportionate to the head. Phylogenetic evidence indicates that this tribe is synonymous with Vespertilionini, and thus its genera are now placed there.

Taxonomy 
The first description of the taxon was published in 1865 by Wilhelm Peters.

References

Vesper bats
Mammals described in 1865
Taxa named by Wilhelm Peters
Bats of Oceania